Narendra Keshav Sawaikar is a politician from Goa India and a member of the 16th Lok Sabha. He represented the South Goa seat.

Personal life
He was born on 29 December. He completed his SSCE from M.I.B.K. High School, Khandepar, Ponda in 1982. After completing his HSSCE from the Dhempe Higher Secondary School in Panaji, he pursued B.A. from the Bombay University in 1987.

Sawaikar achieved a degree in law (LL.B) from the Goa University in 1994. His wife is a teacher by profession.

Political and legal career
Sawaikar was elected as the Chairman of the Students' Council of Goa University from 1989 to 1990 and 1990 to 1991.

He entered legal profession in the year 1995-96 as a junior under Justice Ferdino Rebello, the former Chief Justice of Allahabad High Court. He was the Standing Counsel for Union of India in the High court of Bombay at Goa in the year 2001 to 2004 and the Additional Govt. Advocate for Govt. of Goa in the High Court in the year 2002 to 2004.

He joined the BJP In 1997 and served as general secretary for nine years. In 2007, he was appointed as state secretary of BJP's Goa unit and in 2009 appointed as state general secretary again till today he is General secretary of BJP Goa Pradesh.

He also served as the Chairman of the Goa State Law Commission. Being associated with the Goa Bagayatdar Sahakari Kharedi Vikri Sanstha Maryadit- the state's largest cooperative society since 2006, also he served as the society's Chairman.

He contested the 2009 Lok Sabha elections from South Goa seat and was defeated by Francisco Sardinha of the Indian National Congress. He contested 2014 Lok Sabha elections from the South Goa seat as BJP candidate. He won the election and became a member of the 16th Lok Sabha. On 5 June 2014, he took oath as member of the 16th Lok Sabha in Konkani language.

Election results

References

1972 births
India MPs 2014–2019
Living people
Lok Sabha members from Goa
People from South Goa district
Bharatiya Janata Party politicians from Goa